State Highway 4 (SH-4) connects Arcot with Villupuram. Total length of SH-4 is 114 km.

SH-4 Route
Arcot -Thimiri -Arani - Chetput - Valathi - Gingee - Muttathur - Villupuram Road. 
Villupuram Road refers to the junction of SH-4 with NH-45 near Villupuram (Katpadi Gate). 
Katpadi Gate refers to crossing of Villupuram-Katpadi rail line on NH-45.

External links
 Arcot-Villupuram State Highway Map

State highways in Tamil Nadu